This article contains a list of exonyms in German for geographical places in the current and previous territory of Latvia. A large part of the Latgale region of Latvia was included in the Polish–Lithuanian Commonwealth (1569-1772), later in the Vitebsk Guberniya of the Russian Empire (1804-1917), hence the common practice of transcribing Polish exonyms into German when no German exonym existed.

There were quite a number of shtetls in Latvia before World War II and the Holocaust, and so transcribed Yiddish exonyms in Latin letters of places in Latvia also exist.

Exonyms in this list were used in the first half of the 20th century and perhaps somewhat earlier. The spelling of the exonyms changes the further back in time they occur, since the German language changed considerably during the seven centuries of German presence in the Baltics.

Complete list

References

See also 
German exonyms
Latvian-German and German-Latvian exonyms

Latvia
Geographic history of Latvia
Latvia geography-related lists